Yemeni or Yemenite War may refer to various events in the history of Yemen:

 Yemeni–Ottoman conflicts (up to 1911)
 North Yemeni Civil War (1962–1970)
 Aden Emergency or Radfan Uprising (1963–1967)
 (First) Yemenite War of 1972 (1972)
 (Second) Yemenite War of 1979 (1979)
 South Yemeni Civil War (1986)
 Yemeni unification (1990)
 (First) Yemeni Civil War (1994) 
 (Second) Yemeni Civil War (2015–present)

See also
Yemen
List of wars involving Yemen
List of wars involving South Yemen